Araeomolis irregularis is a moth of the family Erebidae. It was described by Walter Rothschild in 1909, originally under the genus Idalus. It is found in French Guiana and the Brazilian state of Amazonas.

References

Phaegopterina
Moths of South America
Moths described in 1909